Michael John "Bloomer" Bloomfield (born March 16, 1959) is an American former astronaut and a veteran of three Space Shuttle missions.

Early life and education
Born in Flint and raised in Lake Fenton, Michigan, Bloomfield received his bachelor's degree in Engineering Mechanics from the United States Air Force Academy, where he played Falcons football for coach Bill Parcells and was the team's captain. He became an F-15 fighter pilot with the rare combination of having graduated the Fighter Weapons Instructor Course (FWIC, pronounced 'Fwick') and then selected as a test pilot (assigned to the F-16 test squadron at Edwards AFB). He earned his master's degree in Engineering Management from Old Dominion University in 1993.

NASA career
Selected by NASA in December 1994, Bloomfield reported to the Johnson Space Center in March 1995. He worked as Chief of Safety for the Astronaut Office, Chief Instructor Astronaut, Director of Shuttle Operations, and Chief of the Shuttle Branch, which oversees all Shuttle technical issues for the Astronaut Office.

He first flew as a pilot aboard STS-86 in 1997, where he docked with the space station Mir. Bloomfield also piloted STS-97 in 2000 and commanded STS-110 in 2002, both missions to the International Space Station.

Bloomfield has served as Deputy Director of Flight Crew Operations at NASA's Johnson Space Center in Houston, Texas since 2006, before resigning from NASA in July 2007. Michael then became Vice President of the Constellation Program for ATK.

Post-NASA career
He currently serves on the board of directors at Space Center Houston  and resides in suburban Houston, Texas.

References

External links

 
 Spacefacts biography of Michael J. Bloomfield

1959 births
Living people
People from Flint, Michigan
American test pilots
Aviators from Michigan
Air Force Falcons football players
Military personnel from Michigan
Old Dominion University alumni
U.S. Air Force Test Pilot School alumni
United States Air Force Academy alumni
United States Air Force astronauts
United States Air Force officers
Space Shuttle program astronauts
Mir crew members